Plebeia droryana is a species of stingless bee that is in the family Apidae and tribe Meliponini. Bees of the species are normally found in a few states in southern Brazil and their nests can be found in tree cavities. Depending on the region, P. remota may have a different morphology and exhibit different behaviors. The bee's diet consists of nectar and pollen that are collected intensely from a few sources. Researchers have conducted a multitude of studies analyzing the changes that occur in the colony during reproductive diapause and what happens during the Provisioning and Oviposition Process or POP.

References

Meliponini
Hymenoptera of South America
Invertebrates of Brazil
Insects described in 1903